414 is the English ordinal four hundred and fourteen

414 may refer to:

 414 (number)

Dates
 414 CE (CDXIV), a year in the Western calendar, "A.D. 414"
 414 BC, a year in the Western calendar, "414 BCE"

Places
 414 Liriope (asteroid 414), main belt asteroid 
 Route 414, see List of highways numbered 414
 Area code 414
 414 (Mexico City Metrobús), a BRT station in Mexico City

Computing
 The 414s, a group of hackers
 HTTP 414, WWW status code

Aviation
 Cessna 414 Chancellor, a pressurized light-twin-prop sub-10 passenger plane.
 Breguet 414, interwar bomber of France

See also
 
 
 414th (disambiguation)
 1.414
 Gum arabic (E414) food additive
 Tan-Sahsa Flight 414